Fire management may refer to: 

 Fire prevention, preventing unwanted fires such as house fires, forest fires, and industrial fires
 Fire control, preventing unwanted spread of fires
 Fire § Fire management, the skilled modulation of a fire for cooking, heating, or smithing purposes

See also
 Fire discipline, which directs military shooting
 Fire-control system, which directs military shooting
 Field artillery § Fire direction center
 Director (military), for artillery direction